Old Sarepta (Russian Старая Сарепта) now Krasnoarmeysky Rayon, is a district of Volgograd, in Russia.
Sarepta was founded 28 kilometers south of Tsaritsyn by the Moravian Brethren  in 1765 when Catherine II sought to attract German settlers (so-called Volga Germans) to expand crop production in southern Russia and defend against the invasions of Kalmyk, Kazakh, and Tatar tribes. Its name comes from Sarepta in I Kings 17:9-10 and here derives from that of the Sarpa river, which flows into the Volga nearby.

The city was renamed Krasnoarmeisk in 1920, and became a district of Volgograd (then Stalingrad)  in 1931.

A set of eighteenth century buildings in Sarepta that escaped the bombing during the Battle of Stalingrad is since 1990 an open-air museum called the Old Sarepta Museum of History and Ethnography.

When the German Lutheran church made efforts to bring Old Serepta under its influence, some of the Moravian Brethren emigrated to Canada and founded New Sarepta.

References
 Lächele, Rainer Die Herrnhuter-Kolonie Sarepta und die Mennonitensiedlung Chortitza. Wolgograd, 2001.

External links

 Article about the museum
  Article about Old Sarepta

Museums in Volgograd Oblast
Cities and towns in Volgograd Oblast
Open-air museums in Russia
History museums in Russia
Volga German people
German communities in Russia